Robert Obojski (October 19, 1929  –  October 31, 2020) was an American author of over 50 books on baseball, coin and stamp collecting and memorabilia and a numismatist.

Early life and education

Obojski was born October 19, 1929 and grew up in Cleveland, Ohio. He attended Western Reverse University (now Case Western University); he graduated with a BA in History in 1951, an MA in English in 1952, and his Ph.D in 1955 in American Studies. His dissertation was "Robert Grant: Satirist of Old Boston and Intellectual Leader of the New."

Career

Obojski taught at Detroit Institute of Technology (1957–60), Western Kentucky State College (1962–64), Alliance College in Cambridge Springs, Pennsylvania (1964–66, 1967–69), Edinboro University (1966–67), and Delaware State College (1970–72) Full Professor.

Obojski worked as contributing editor for Sports Collectors Digest, Global Stamp News, and Linn's Weekly Stamp News. He was an ongoing contributor to Teddy Bear Review as well as publications from Sterling Publishing. 

He had lived in Port Washington, New York and he died in Roslyn, New York.

Publications 

His books included the notable Bush League: a History of Minor League Baseball (1975), Great Moments of the Playoffs & World Series (1988), and The Rise of Japanese Baseball Power (1975). He also wrote A First Stamp Album for Beginners (1984, 1st ed.), which was reprinted and revised.

Authored 

 

 

 This is a pocket-sized reference book.

Co-authored 
Other books co-written or edited by Robert Obojski:

References

External links
 BookFinder.com page on Robert Objoski

1929 births
2020 deaths
American numismatists
Case Western Reserve University alumni
Delaware State University people
Western Kentucky University faculty
People from Port Washington, New York
American male writers
People from Cleveland